Cyperus chlorocephalus is a species of sedge that is native to parts of Central America and northern parts of South America.

See also 
 List of Cyperus species

References 

chlorocephalus
Plants described in 1936
Flora of Ecuador
Flora of Belize
Flora of Colombia
Flora of French Guiana
Flora of Guatemala
Flora of Guyana
Flora of Mexico
Flora of Peru
Flora of Venezuela
Taxa named by Georg Kükenthal